The 2014 King's Cup is a football tournament that took place from 15 November 2014 to 2 December 2014. The tournament was held in Thimphu, Bhutan at the Changlimithang Stadium. Sheikh Jamal Dhanmondi Club won the championship.

Venue

Group stage
The nine participants were divided into two groups. The top two teams for each group qualified for the semifinals. Osotspa F.C. of Thailand was set to participate at the tournament and was included in Group B. Osotspa withdrew and was replaced by Pune F.C. of India.

Group A

Group B

Knock-out stage

Semifinals

Final

Awards

Top scorers

Team statistics
This table will show the ranking of teams throughout the tournament.

References

King's Cup (Bhutan)
King's Cup
Bhutan
King's Cup
King's Cup